The 2013 Asian Women's Club Volleyball Championship was the 14th staging of the AVC Club Championships. The tournament was held in Buôn Ma Thuột, Đắk Lắk Province, Vietnam.

Pools composition
The teams are seeded based on their final ranking at the 2012 Asian Women's Club Volleyball Championship.

Preliminary round

Pool A

|}

|}

Pool B

|}

|}

Final round

Quarterfinals

|}

5th–8th semifinals

|}

Semifinals

|}

7th place

|}

5th place

|}

3rd place

|}

Final

|}

Final standing

Awards
MVP:  Xu Yunli (Guangdong)
Best Scorer:  Jong Jin-sim (Bo Tong Gang)
Best Spiker:  Zhou Yuan (Guangdong)
Best Blocker:  Xu Yunli (Guangdong)
Best Server:  Zhou Yuan (Guangdong)
Best Setter:  Korinna Ishimtseva (Zhetyssu)
Best Libero:  Zhang Xian (Guangdong)

References

External links
Asian Volleyball Confederation

2013 Asian Women's Club Volleyball Championship
Asian Women's Club Volleyball Championship
2013 in Vietnamese women's sport
International volleyball competitions hosted by Vietnam